Andrew Robert Beech (born 17 April 1962) is a justice with the Supreme Court of Western Australia. He is a graduate of the Bachelor of Civil Law program at Magdalen College at the University of Oxford. While studying at Oxford, he made four appearances in first-class cricket for Oxford University Cricket Club in 1987.

On 24 May 2017, Justice Beech was appointed to the Court of Appeal.

References

1962 births
Living people
Alumni of Magdalen College, Oxford
Australian cricketers
Oxford University cricketers
Judges of the Supreme Court of Western Australia
Australian Senior Counsel